Ragöse is a river of Brandenburg, Germany. It has several sources near Chorin and runs over a distance of  through the Schorfheide-Chorin Biosphere Reserve to the Finow Canal, east of Eberswalde.

See also
List of rivers of Brandenburg

External links

Rivers of Brandenburg
Rivers of Germany